Emily J. Erbelding (born 1961) is an American physician-scientist. She is the director of the Division of Microbiology and Infectious Diseases at the National Institute of Allergy and Infectious Diseases (NIAID). Erbelding was previously deputy director of the Division of AIDS at NIAID. She was a faculty member at Johns Hopkins School of Medicine and served as director of clinical services for the Baltimore City Health Department STD/HIV program.

Education 
Erbelding graduated cum laude from Cornell University, where she also received a master of science degree. Her 1985 master's thesis was titled Glutamine metabolism in the small intestine. She earned her medical degree from Indiana University School of Medicine and completed her residency in internal medicine at Northwestern University Medical Center, serving as chief medical resident. While completing a fellowship in infectious diseases at the Johns Hopkins Hospital, she also earned a Master of Public Health degree with a concentration in epidemiology from the Johns Hopkins Bloomberg School of Public Health.

Career 
Erbelding spent 14 years on the faculty of the Johns Hopkins School of Medicine, in the division of infectious diseases, and was the director of clinical services for the Baltimore City Health Department STD/HIV program.

Erbelding served as deputy director of the Division of AIDS at the National Institute of Allergy and Infectious Diseases (NIAID). There she was involved in all aspects of scientific program management and support, helping to design and implement new initiatives involving basic, translational and clinical research and administering complex extramural grant programs and research infrastructure.

In 2017, Erbelding became director of the NIAID Division of Microbiology and Infectious Diseases (DMID). She is responsible for the strategic and scientific vision for DMID's complex national and international research program. DMID supports basic, preclinical, and clinical investigations into the causes, diagnosis, treatment, and prevention of a broad range of pathogens, including those related to biodefense and emerging infectious diseases.

Erbelding serves on the acute flaccid myelitis task force at the Centers for Disease Control and Prevention.

References 

Cornell University alumni
Place of birth missing (living people)
Indiana University School of Medicine alumni
Johns Hopkins Bloomberg School of Public Health alumni
National Institutes of Health people
Johns Hopkins University faculty
20th-century American biologists
21st-century American biologists
20th-century American women scientists
21st-century American women scientists
20th-century American women physicians
20th-century American physicians
21st-century American women physicians
21st-century American physicians
American microbiologists
Women microbiologists
American medical researchers
Women medical researchers
HIV/AIDS researchers
Living people
American women academics
1961 births